Anne Johnson Davis (died July 29, 2010) was an American author and public speaker who in 2008 published Hell Minus One, a memoir in which she claimed to have been a childhood victim of Satanic ritual abuse (SRA). In the book, Davis further claimed that her allegations of abuse were corroborated through a confession by her mother and stepfather made to Lt. Detective Matt Jacobson of the Utah Attorney General's office.

History
In her memoir, Davis discusses her alleged abuse from the ages of 3 to 17, including sexual abuse, torture, and being forced to hurt her siblings in the context of satanic rituals, and her departure from her home at age 17. Davis made the allegations public in 1995 under the pseudonym Rachel Hopkins. At the time an investigation was underway by the Utah Attorney General's office into Satanic ritual abuse (SRA). According to Davis, her memories of abuse began surfacing in 1993. In 2008, Transcript Bulletin Publishing published  Davis' memoir, Hell Minus One.

Confessions
In 1995, under the name Rachel Hopkins, Davis states she was abused after a report was released by the Utah Attorney General's office that downplayed the existence of ritual abuse.  As evidence, Davis provided a photo showing herself as a child with bruises, and also claimed her siblings corroborated her story. In addition, Davis provided a confession by her mother and stepfather regarding the abuse to detectives in the Attorney General's Office. Her parents also confessed to two investigators from the office, as well as to the leaders of the church they attended. In her book, Davis states that her parents were excommunicated by the LDS Church and sold their home to pay for her therapy.

False Memory Syndrome
The False Memory Syndrome Foundation has reviewed the book; Davis blamed proponents of false memory syndrome for her family not being prosecuted, as well as privacy concerns and the statute of limitations for not pressing charges.  Davis also noted that without corroborative evidence (beyond the confessions) she would probably still have to prove she did not suffer from false memory syndrome or dissociative identity disorder. The False Memory Syndrome Foundation concludes its review with the rhetorical question "Is Ann Davis’s story an example of a confirmed case of satanic ritual abuse? We leave it to FMSF Newsletter readers to decide."

See also
 Pace memorandum

References

American memoirists
American women memoirists
Satanic ritual abuse hysteria in the United States
Year of birth missing
2010 deaths